is a mountain located on the border between Gifu and Fukui prefectures in the Chūbu region of Japan. It is also the source of the Ibi River.

The mountain peak has a small area that can only hold about 10 people, but it offers an unobstructed 360-degree panoramic view. There is also a triangulation station on the peak.

Hiking
There is one prepared hiking trail on the mountain, and it takes about 2 hours to reach the peak. At the beginning of the trail, there are several steep climbs through an old growth forest. There is a fork in the path near the peak; the left fork leads to the Kanmuri Flats, while the right leads to the mountain peak.

References

Kanmuri, Mount
Kanmuri, Mount